Harold Augustus Davies MM (29 January 1904 – 23 April 1975) was an English footballer who played in the Football League for Huddersfield Town, Port Vale and most notably, Stoke City. A creative inside-forward, he played 513 games in the league and FA Cup, scoring 122 goals. His father, also called Harry, was also a professional footballer.

He spent seven seasons with Stoke from 1922 to 1929, helping the club to the Third Division North title in 1926–27. He then spent two seasons with Huddersfield Town, and featured in the 1930 FA Cup Final defeat to Arsenal. He made a return to Stoke in February 1932, and spent another six seasons at the Victoria Ground, helping the club to the Second Division title in 1932–33. Having scored 101 goals in 411 matches for the "Potters" in his two spells, he was traded to Port Vale in February 1938. He retired in April 1939, and later fought in World War II.

Playing career
Davies was born in Gainsborough and attended Queen Elizabeth's High School. His father was a former footballer who played for Doncaster Rovers, Gainsborough Trinity, Hull City and Wolverhampton Wanderers. The family moved to Staffordshire after Harry senior retired and Harry junior followed his father into playing football. He was spotted by Stoke City playing for Bamfords Athletic in the Uttoxeter amateur league and he was quickly thrust into first team action with Stoke struggling to stay afloat in the First Division. He scored in his second appearance against West Bromwich Albion to earn Stoke their first win of the 1922–23 season but it failed to avert the slide and ended with Stoke being relegated after finishing four points from safety. He became a key player in the 1923–24 season in a side which challenged for a return to the top flight, finishing as second highest scorer to Jimmy Broad. A poor run form towards the end of the season saw Stoke miss out promotion and instead to finish a disappointing sixth place. Although a first choice player in 1924–25, Davies was hampered by injuries, and an unsettled and inexperienced Stoke side only avoided relegation by a single point. Stoke failed to learn in 1925–26 and were relegated to the Third Division North. Stoke bounced back quickly in 1926–27 and won the divisional title with relative ease, with Davies scoring a career best of 17 goals. He played regularly in the side for the next two seasons before he joined Huddersfield Town in 1929. He played for the "Professionals" in the 1929 FA Charity Shield.

The "Terriers" were looking to recapture their form under manager Herbert Chapman which saw them dominate English football in the early 1920s and saw Davies as a replacement for England international Clem Stephenson who had become manager. In his first season with Town Davies top scored with 10 goals and played in the 1930 FA Cup Final as Huddersfield lost 2–0 to Arsenal. Following that set-back he fell out of favour at Leeds Road and Stoke manager Tom Mather wasted no time in bringing him back to the Victoria Ground in February 1932. Davies' return was met with approval by the club's supporters and was key in helping Stoke to win Second Division title in 1932–33. He linked up well with Stanley Matthews and when Bob McGrory stepped into managing the reserves, Davies was handed the captaincy. Back in the First Division, Davies was a key member of an exciting Stoke attack and he became only the second player to pass 100 goals after Charlie Wilson.

With Davies' career coming to an end he joined local rivals Port Vale – along with a small fee, for Tommy Ward in February 1938. He played 15 Third Division North games at the end of the 1937–38 season, claiming two goals. He scored twice in 29 league games in the 1938–39 campaign, as the "Valiants" switch into the Third Division South meant that he had scored a goal in all four divisions of the Football League. Davies retired in April 1939.

Style of play

After football
Davies' retired from playing just before World War II and he earned a Military Medal while serving with the Royal Army Service Corps. After the war he became owner of the Priory hotel in Abbey Hulton and then the Plume of Feathers in Barlaston. He also became a very good snooker player and competed in regional tournaments.

Media career
Davies was one of the first players to write a newspaper column. He was paid sixpence a word, which at 200 words a column gave him a total of £5 a week, which equalled his footballing wage.

Career statistics
Source:

Honours
Stoke City
 Football League Third Division North: 1926–27
 Football League Second Division: 1932–33

Huddersfield Town
 FA Cup runner-up: 1930

References

1904 births
1975 deaths
People from Gainsborough, Lincolnshire
English footballers
Association football inside forwards
Stoke City F.C. players
Huddersfield Town A.F.C. players
Port Vale F.C. players
English Football League players
Royal Army Service Corps soldiers
British Army personnel of World War II
Recipients of the Military Medal
FA Cup Final players